The Catskill High Peaks are all of the mountains in New York's Catskill Mountains above  in elevation whose summits are separated either by  or a vertical drop of at least  between it and the next nearest separate summit. By usual standards, these mountains are rather low and rounded, and mostly covered by vegetation. 

Unlike the Adirondack High Peaks, those in the Catskills are more evenly distributed around the eastern half of the range instead of being confined to one small area. All except Bearpen and Vly lie within the Catskill Park Blue Line.

The 3500s

The  elevation was chosen in the early 1950s when Dan Smiley, a descendant of the founders of Mohonk Mountain House and his fellow birders were trying to find the elusive Bicknell's thrush, which prefers to nest and breed in the boreal forests that predominate above that elevation in the Catskills. They drew up a list nearly identical to the one below and published it in a naturalists' journal.

A decade later hikers interested in peak bagging formed the Catskill Mountain 3500 Club, an organization similar to the better-known Adirondack 46ers, to promote the climbing of 34 of the 35 peaks listed below ("Southwest Hunter" was added to the list in 1992). The club implemented the peak-separation rule, modeled on the one already in use by the Appalachian Mountain Club. Prospective members are required to climb all (13 have no established route to the summit, requiring a bushwack) and then do Slide, Blackhead, Balsam and Panther mountains again in wintertime.

Today the New York State Department of Environmental Conservation enforces special rules for all the lands it manages in the Catskills above , whether tiny plots such as on Rocky or vast ridgetops as on Plateau, Hunter and West Kill, due to the fragility of the ecosystems. In these areas, camping is permitted only in dire emergencies except during winter, when snow shields the earth somewhat, and open fires are banned. Almost all were designated bird conservation areas by Governor George Pataki in 1999, due to Bicknell's and other vulnerable species that return there in springtime to nest and breed.

The high peaks 

Surveys of the Catskills date to the 1940s at the newest, and exact elevations have never been officially determined for many of these peaks. In those cases, their elevations are indicated by the highest  contour shown on the United States Geological Survey (USGS) quadrangles with a plus (+) sign.

 The name is currently unofficial. It refers to the peak that rises between Hunter and West Kill on the USGS Lexington quad

 This refers not to "Bearpen Mountain" shown on the USGS Prattsville quad straddling the border between Delaware and Greene counties at 3,520 feet (1073 m), but rather the unnamed higher area approximately one-half mile (800 m) to the southeast in Greene County.

Potential High Peaks
Without the aforementioned "AND" ruling of the Catskill 3500 Club, the unnamed summit west of Thomas Cole (unofficially referred to as "Camel's Hump") sits within the  contour and is more than the required distance from that peak's summit. No one has yet considered it a High Peak, however.

The inexact nature of past USGS surveys of the region have led to speculation that two 3,480-foot (1,060 m) summits in the western Catskills might prove to be High Peaks if measurements were redone with more modern technology. GPS readings on some summits have consistently suggested higher elevations than those given on the maps.

Mill Brook Ridge, the named summit of the pair, would displace neighboring Balsam Lake as the westernmost Catskill High Peak were any of the land in its summit contour found to exceed 3,500 feet. However, much of that land is as flat as the map suggests and the peak may come close to that height but not over it.

The other is "East Schoolhouse Mountain," the unofficial name for the higher of the two peaks on the ridge between Balsam Lake and neighboring Graham. Digital Elevation Modeling (DEM) data in some mapping software suggests its summit may just exceed the limit.

There is also a tiny  contour indicated more than a half-mile east of West Kill's summit, right next to the drop into Diamond Notch, but exploration of that area has cast doubt on whether it actually exists.

See also
Catskill Mountains
Munro

External links 
 Catskill 3500 Peak List
 
 Guide to Peakbagging the Catskill 3500’s

 
Catskills

Peak bagging in the United States